Pudiyankam, or Puthiyankam is a village in Alathur Taluk, located in the Palakkad district of the southern Indian state of Kerala.

References

Villages in Palakkad district